Osterbach is a small river of Hesse, Germany. It is a left tributary of the Fulda northeast of Kassel.

See also
List of rivers of Hesse

Rivers of Hesse
Rivers of Germany